Liliana Segre  (born 10 September 1930) is an Italian Holocaust survivor, named senator for life by President Sergio Mattarella in 2018 for outstanding patriotic merits in the social field.

Born in 1930 into a Milanese family of Jewish origins, in 1938 Segre was expelled from her primary school after the promulgation of the Italian Racial Laws. In 1943, she was arrested with her family and deported to the Auschwitz concentration camp. The only survivor among her relatives, with the end of the World War II in 1945, she returned to Milan. After decades of silence, in the 1990s she started to speak to the public, especially young students, about her experience.

Biography 

Born in Milan into a family of Jewish origins, Segre lived with her father Alberto and her paternal grandparents, Giuseppe Segre and Olga Loevvy. Her mother, Lucia Foligno, died when Liliana was not yet one year old. Her family was secular, and the awareness of being Jewish came to Liliana only after the drama of the Italian Racial Laws of 1938, after which she was expelled from school.

After the intensification of the persecution of the Italian Jews, her father hid her at a friend's home, using false documents. On 10 December 1943, at the age of thirteen, together with her father, Segre tried to flee to Switzerland, but both were rejected by the Swiss authorities.

On 11 December 1943, she was arrested by fascists in the province of Varese at Selvetta di Viggiù. After six days in prison in Varese, she was transferred to Como and finally to Milan, where she was detained for 40 days. On 30 January 1944, Segre was deported from platform 21 of the Milan Central railway station to the Auschwitz concentration camp, where she arrived seven days later. She was immediately separated from her father Alberto, whom she never saw again and who would be killed on 27 April 1944 (see the memorial plaque below). On 18 May 1944 her paternal grandparents were arrested in Inverigo, in the Province of Como, and deported after a few weeks to Auschwitz, where they were also killed on their arrival on 30 June.

At the selection, Segre was tattooed with the serial number 75190. She was employed in forced labour in the Union ammunition factory, which belonged to Siemens, for about one year. During her imprisonment, she underwent three other selections. In January 1945, after the evacuation of the camp, she faced the death march towards Ravensbrück concentration camp in Germany. After some weeks spent there in terrible conditions, she was marched on to its satellite Malchow concentration camp where she was liberated by the Red Army on 1 May 1945. Out of the 776 Italian children aged 14 or younger who were deported to the Auschwitz concentration camp, only 35 survived.

After the Nazi Holocaust, Segre moved to the Marche region where she lived with her maternal grandparents, the only surviving members of her family. In 1948, she met Alfredo Belli Paci, a Catholic political prisoner who had also survived the Nazi concentration camps. The two married in 1951 and had three children.

Testimony 

For a long time, Segre never wanted to speak publicly about her experience in concentration camps. Like many Holocaust children, returning home and to a normal life was far from easy. She also remembers that she did not find in those years any ear willing to listen to her. In 1996, she recalled:

It was only in the early 1990s that she decided to interrupt her silence: since then she went to school assemblies and conferences to tell young people her story, also on behalf of the millions of others who shared it with her and who have never been able to communicate it. In 1997, she was among the witnesses of the documentary film Memoria, presented at the Berlin International Film Festival.

Conversations with three women who survived from Auschwitz). In 2005 her story was retraced with more details in a book-interview by Emanuela Zuccalà,  (Survived in Auschwitz: Liliana Segre among the last witnesses of the Shoah. Also in 2005, she gave a video interview lasting more than five hours to Doris Felsen which is available in the Online Archive Forced Labor 1939–1945.

In 2009, Segre lent her voice  ('Tales of those who have survived'), a research project conducted by Marcello Pezzetti between 1995 and 2008 on behalf of the Center of Contemporary Jewish Documentation of Milan, which led to the collection of testimonies of almost all the Italian survivors from Nazi concentration camps who were still alive. In the same year, she participated in Moni Ovadia's film-documentary  (Platform 21) directed by Felice Cappa, which was inspired by the poem  ("The Song of the Murdered Jewish People") written by Polish poet Itzhak Katzenelson.

On 27 November 2008, the University of Trieste awarded Segre with an honorary degree in Law. On 15 December 2010, the University of Verona awarded her with an honorary degree in Pedagogy. On 26 October 2020, LUMSA University awarded her with an honorary degree in International relations.

Senator for life 

On 19 January 2018, the 80th anniversary of the Italian Racial Laws, the President of the Italian Republic, Sergio Mattarella, on the basis of article 59 subsection 2 of the Italian Constitution, appointed Segre as senator for life for outstanding patriotic merits in the social field.

Segre is the fourth woman to hold such position, after Camilla Ravera, Rita Levi-Montalcini, and Elena Cattaneo. As the first legislative act, she proposed the establishment of a Parliamentary Control Commission on racism, antisemitism and incitement to hatred and violence, supported by Senator for life colleagues Renzo Piano and Elena Cattaneo. On 30 October 2019, the Senate of the Republic, with 151 votes in favor, approved the motion, which established the commission.

On 7 November 2019, due to numerous threats received on social media, she was assigned a bodyguard by the Prefect of Milan, Renato Saccone.

On 29 January 2020, invited by David Sassoli for the International Holocaust Remembrance Day and the 75th anniversary of the liberation of Auschwitz, she spoke before the European Parliament, where she received an ovation by the full assembly.

On 18 February 2020, during the Sapienza University of Rome academic year inauguration, also attended by President Mattarella, she was awarded a PhD honoris causa in European history, which she dedicated to her father Alberto, "killed for the guilt of being born (Jewish)".

On 9 October 2020, after 30 years of public witnesses about her life, she gave her last public speech in Rondine (Arezzo, Tuscany), where she invited the young not to blame others for their own failures and weakness, because they are very strong. The event was streamed and followed by thousands of students all across Italy.

On 2 February 2021, the University of Pisa awarded Segre with an honorary degree in peace and conflict studies.

Heading into the 2022 Italian general election, Segre told  that Giorgia Meloni, leader of Brothers of Italy (FdI), should remove the tricolour flame, which is considered to be a neo-fascist symbol, from the party's logo. She was supported by the Democratic Party. FdI's co-founder Ignazio La Russa rejected this view, and Meloni ignored the request, keeping the tricolour flame in the party's election logo. On 13 October 2022, she presided the Senate's section during which she proclaimed La Russa as new President of the Senate.

See also 
 Children in the Holocaust
 List of Holocaust survivors

References

Bibliography

External links 
 
 

1930 births
20th-century Italian Jews
21st-century Italian Jews
Auschwitz concentration camp survivors
Italian life senators
Jewish Italian politicians
Knights Commander of the Order of Merit of the Federal Republic of Germany
Living people
Malchow concentration camp survivors
People from Milan